Zerto provides disaster recovery, ransomware resilience and workload mobility software for virtualized infrastructures and cloud environments.  Zerto is a subsidiary of Hewlett Packard Enterprise company which is headquartered in Spring, Texas, USA.

History
Ziv Kedem, Zerto's founder and CEO, previously co-founded Kashya.  Zerto has received investments from venture capital firms such as 83North (formerly Greylock IL), Battery Ventures, Harmony Partners, RTP Ventures, IVP, and USVP. In 2016, the company was ranked #45 on the Deloitte Fast 500 North America list.  Zerto IT Resilience Platform 6.0 is a Silver Winner in the Backup and Disaster Recovery Software Category in Storage Magazine and SearchStorage’s 2018 Product of the Year. 

Zerto was bought by Hewlett Packard Enterprise in 2021 for $374 million.

Products
Zerto simplifies the protection, recovery, and mobility of on-premises and cloud applications. Zerto’s simple, software-only solution uses continuous data protection at scale to solve for ransomware resilience, disaster recovery and data mobility across private, public, and hybrid deployments. Zerto supports VMware, Hyper-V, AWS, Microsoft Azure, IBM Cloud, Google Cloud, Oracle Cloud, and more than 350 managed service providers.

Zerto provides disaster recovery software for virtualized and cloud infrastructures. The company's original product, Zerto Virtual Replication, was released in August 2011. The technology leverages 'hypervisor-based replication', which moves data replication up the server stack from the storage layer into the hypervisor. 

Zerto for Kubernetes was introduced in 2020 integrating backup, disaster recovery, and mobility into the application development lifecycle, running on-premises or in the cloud, to enable data protection as code. Supported environments include AKS, VMware Tanzu, GKS, HPE Ezmeral, Amazon EKS, IBM Cloud Kubernetes service, Oracle Container Engine for Kubernetes and OpenShift.

Zerto Backup for SaaS powered by Keepit introduced in 2021 provides a simple cloud backup built on the world’s only secure cloud dedicated to SaaS data protection and includes support for Microsoft 365, Salesforce, Google Workspace, Microsoft Dynamics, and Microsoft Active directory.

References 

Disaster recovery
Software companies established in 2009
Software companies of Israel
Software companies based in Massachusetts
VMware
Hewlett-Packard Enterprise acquisitions
2021 mergers and acquisitions
Israeli companies established in 2009
2009 establishments in Massachusetts